Melissa Maxine Skelton (born 1951) is the bishop provisional of the Episcopal Diocese of Olympia. She was previously the 9th Bishop of the Anglican Diocese of New Westminster, a diocese in the Anglican Church of Canada, and was the 12th Metropolitan of the Ecclesiastical Province of British Columbia and Yukon. She was the first woman to be elected a metropolitan and archbishop in Anglican Church of Canada. Skelton was succeeded in her ministry as Bishop of New Westminster by John Stephens on February 28, 2021.

Early life and education
Skelton was born in 1951, and raised in the US South, specifically, Alabama and Georgia. She came to faith in the Episcopal Church in her 20s. Throughout her adult life, she worked in the corporate world as well as maintaining a vocation for ministry.

Ordained ministry
Prior to her election as bishop, she was rector at St. Paul's Episcopal Church, Seattle, Washington, and also canon for Congregational Development and Leadership – Diocese of Olympia, Seattle, Washington. As canon, Skelton developed a congregational development program that adopts the gather–transform–send model, and this program was established as the core curriculum for the College for Congregational Development in the Episcopal Diocese of Olympia, the college that she founded during her nine-year incumbency at St. Paul's. In mid-2016 the Episcopal Diocese of Chicago added the College for Congregational Development to its program roster. As of May 2018, the School was active in four Episcopal church dioceses in the United States and one other diocese in Canada, the Diocese of Ottawa.

Episcopal ministry
On November 30, 2013, Skelton was elected the 9th Bishop of the Anglican Diocese of New Westminster: it was on the third ballot and by a substantial majority at an electoral synod held at Christ Church Cathedral, Vancouver, British Columbia, Canada. She was consecrated and installed in Vancouver on St. David's Day, March 1, 2014. The consecration event was a three-hour liturgy that took place in different locations, beginning at the Vancouver Convention Centre, followed by a procession through downtown Vancouver and then at the procession's destination, Christ Church Cathedral. Skelton was the first woman, the first American and the first person to have had a career outside of the church prior to ordination to be Bishop of the Diocese of New Westminster.

April 27, 2018, Skelton was named episcopal visitor to the North American province of the Society of Catholic Priests, which at the time was predominantly a group within the Episcopal Church in the United States.

On May 12, 2018, she was elected Metropolitan of the Ecclesiastical Province of British Columbia and Yukon, an office that comes with the title archbishop. She was elected by the members of the provincial house of bishops and the electoral college of the province on the first ballot. She is the first woman to become an archbishop in the Anglican Church of Canada. Skelton was installed as Metropolitan on Holy Cross Day, September 14, 2018, during a celebration of the Eucharist prior to the opening of Provincial Synod in Sorrento, British Columbia.

She announced by letter to the diocese on April 21, 2020, that she would be retiring as archbishop on February 28, 2021, as required by the Provincial Canons, under which bishops must retire by age 70.

Skelton returned to the Diocese of Olympia as an assisting bishop and in 2023 began serving as bishop provisional following the resignation of Gregory Rickel.

Personal life
Skelton married Seattle-based family counsellor Eric Stroo on August 15, 2015, in Cannon Beach, Oregon. Stroo is also a non-stipendary deacon serving in the Episcopal Diocese of Olympia and currently on loan to the Diocese of New Westminster serving at St.Michael's Multicultural Anglican Church in Vancouver, British Columbia. She has three siblings: a brother in San Francisco and two sisters in Atlanta, Georgia.

References

External links
 Biography at diocesan website

1951 births
American Episcopalians
Anglican bishops of New Westminster
Metropolitans of British Columbia
Living people